Home Township is the name of two places in the U.S. state of Michigan:

 Home Township, Montcalm County, Michigan
 Home Township, Newaygo County, Michigan

See also
 Homer Township, Michigan (disambiguation)
 Home Township (disambiguation)
 Homestead Township, Michigan

Michigan township disambiguation pages